Robert Frederick Hainlen (born December 18, 1926) is a former American football quarterback. He played college football at Colorado A&M (now Colorado State) and was drafted by the Washington Redskins in the 19th round of the 1949 NFL Draft. He was sent to their farm team, the Wilmington Clippers before playing in an NFL game. He spent one season with Wilmington before they folded, ending his professional career. He is believed to be the last living member of the Clippers.

Early life and education
Hainlen was born on December 18, 1926, in Trinidad, Colorado. He attended Trinidad High School before playing college football at Colorado A&M. In 1945, as a true freshman, Hainlen was named the Rams' starting quarterback, becoming the youngest starter in school history.

In 1948, following a victory over the Wyoming Cowboys, the Fort Collins Coloradoan reported, "Lanky, Bobby Hainlen picked the cold and bleak setting of Corbett field here Saturday afternoon for his greatest football performance as he ran, passed, and kicked Colorado A & M to a 21-20 victory over the University of Wyoming." Hainlen led the team's "passing, punting, and signal calling." After being named second-team All-Rocky Mountain Conference, the Salt Lake Telegram wrote, "Bob Hainlen of Colorado wound up the season with what almost was a one-man one win over Colorado university, and his running, passing and kicking of field goals gave [Cannon] Parkinson a run for the spot on the first eleven." He lost his final college game in the 1949 Raisin Bowl, 20–21, against Occidental.

Professional career
Following his senior season of college Hainlen was selected in the 19th round (188th overall) of the 1949 NFL Draft by the Washington Redskins. He was given a contract in June. He was sent to their farm team, the Wilmington Clippers, after not making the final roster. With Wilmington he started all but one of their games, leading them to a 5–5 record and a playoff berth. The Clippers lost in the first round of the playoffs, 0–66 against the Richmond Rebels. Wilmington folded after the season, ending his professional career.

Statistically, Hainlen recorded 564 passing yards on 137 attempts, 48 being completed. He threw five touchdown passes and ten interceptions. As a rusher, he scored two touchdowns. On special teams, he made 44 punts.

References

Further reading
 

1926 births
Living people
Players of American football from Colorado
American football quarterbacks
People from Trinidad, Colorado
Colorado State Rams football players
Washington Redskins players
Wilmington Clippers coaches
Wilmington Clippers players